In mathematics, the Bishop–Phelps theorem is a theorem about the topological properties of Banach spaces named after Errett Bishop and Robert Phelps, who published its proof in 1961.

Statement

Importantly, this theorem fails for complex Banach spaces. 
However, for the special case where  is the closed unit ball then this theorem does hold for complex Banach spaces.

See also

References

Banach spaces
Theorems in functional analysis